This is a list of poster artists.

Historic poster artists   
 The Beggarstaffs, active 1893–1899 
 Róbert Berény (1887–1954)
 Gino Boccasile (1901–1952)
 Sándor Bortnyik (1893–1976)
 Firmin Bouisset (1859–1925)
 Leonetto Cappiello (1875–1942)
 Jean Carlu (1900–1997)
 Adolphe Mouron Cassandre (1901–1968)
 Angelo Cesselon (1922–1992)
 Jules Chéret (1836–1932)
 Paul Colin (1892–1985)
 Henri de Toulouse-Lautrec (1864–1901)
 Viktor Deni (1893–1946)
 Tom Eckersley (1914–1995)
 Hans Rudi Erdt (1883–1918)
 Boris Efimov (1900–2008)
 Jean Michel Folon (1934–2005)
 John Gilroy (1898–1985)
 Eugène Grasset (1845–1917)
 Tadeusz Gronowski (1894–1990)
 Albert Guillaume (1873–1942)
 Ludwig Hohlwein (1874–1949)
 Georgy Kovenchuk (1933–2015)
 Gustav Klutsis (1895–1938)
 Privat Livemont (1861–1936)
 Achille Mauzan (1883–1952)
 Dmitry Moor (1883–1946)
 Alfons Mucha (1860–1939)
 Frank Newbould (1887–1951)
 Raymond Savignac (1907–2002)
 Galina Shubina (1902–1980)
 Franciszek Starowieyski (1930–2009)
 Théophile Steinlen (1859–1923)
 Henryk Tomaszewski (1914–2005)
 B.A. Uspensky (1927–2005)
 Heinz Traimer (1921–2002)

Modern poster artists   
 Reza Abedini
 Beautiful Angle
 Michel Bouvet
 Syd Brak
 Pola Brändle
 Seymour Chwast
 Warren Dayton
 Shepard Fairey
 Jim Fitzpatrick
 Shigeo Fukuda
 Jean-Michel Folon
 André François
Erick Ginard
 Milton Glaser
 David Lance Goines
 Smear (Cristian Gheorghiu)
 Fons Hickmann
 Istvan Horkay
 Amos Paul Kennedy, Jr.
 Dóra Keresztes
 Jan Lenica
 Stanley Mouse
 István Orosz
 Rafal Olbinski
 David Plunkert
 Zbigniew Rabsztyn
 Favianna Rodriguez
 Wiesław Rosocha
 Wiktor Sadowski
 Mehdi Saeedi
 Jan Sawka
 Todd Slater
 Waldemar Świerzy
 Piotr Szyhalski
 David Tartakover
 Niklaus Troxler
 Jefferson Wood
 Ames Bros
 T-Bone & Aljax

References 

Poster